Benzoin  or benjamin (corrupted pronunciation) is a balsamic resin obtained from the bark of several species of trees in the genus Styrax. It is used in perfumes and some kinds of incense and as a flavoring and medicine (see tincture of benzoin). It is distinct from the chemical compound benzoin, which is ultimately derived chemically from benzoin resin; the resin, however, does not contain this compound.

Benzoin is sometimes called gum benzoin or gum benjamin, and in India Sambrani or loban, though loban is, via Arabic lubān, a generic term for frankincense-type incense, e.g., fragrant tree resin. Benzoin is also called storax, not to be confused with the balsam of the same name obtained from the Hamamelidaceae family.

Benzoin is a common ingredient in incense-making and perfumery because of its sweet vanilla-like aroma and fixative properties. Gum benzoin is a major component of the type of church incense used in Russia and some other Orthodox Christian societies, as well as Western Catholic Churches. Most benzoin is used in the Arabian Peninsula and Hindu temples of India, where it is burned on charcoal as an incense. It is also used in the production of Bakhoor (Arabic بخور - scented wood chips) as well as various mixed resin incense in the Arab countries and the Horn of Africa. Benzoin is also used in blended types of Japanese incense, Indian incense, Chinese incense (known as Anxi xiang; 安息香), and Papier d'Arménie as well as incense sticks.

There are two common kinds of benzoin, benzoin Siam and benzoin Sumatra. Benzoin Siam is obtained from Styrax tonkinensis, found across Thailand, Laos, Cambodia, and Vietnam. Benzoin Sumatra is obtained from Styrax benzoin, which grows predominantly on the island of Sumatra. Unlike Siamese benzoin, Sumatran benzoin contains cinnamic acid in addition to benzoic acid. In the United States, Sumatra benzoin (Styrax benzoin and Styrax paralleoneurus) is more customarily used in pharmaceutical preparations, Siam benzoin (Styrax tonkinensis etc.) in the flavor and fragrance industries.

In perfumery, benzoin is used as a fixative, slowing the dispersion of essential oils and other fragrance materials into the air. Benzoin is used in cosmetics, veterinary medicine, and scented candles. It is used as a flavoring in alcoholic and nonalcoholic beverages, baked goods, chewing gum, frozen dairy, gelatins, puddings, and soft candy.

See also

References

Resins
Perfume ingredients
Incense material
Essential oils
Non-timber forest products